William Cassandra Rosamonte Barbosa (born 18 December 1983), known as William Barbosa, is São Toméan footballer who plays as a defender for the Portuguese club Estrela de Vendas Novas. He was a member of the São Tomé and Príncipe national team.

References

External links 
 
 
 
 

1983 births
Living people
Association football central defenders
São Tomé and Príncipe footballers
São Tomé and Príncipe international footballers
People from Lobata District
Inter Bom-Bom players
Andorinha Sport Club players
6 de Setembro players
Esporte Clube São Luiz players
G.D. Tourizense players
Horizonte Futebol Clube players
São Tomé and Príncipe expatriate footballers
São Tomé and Príncipe expatriate sportspeople in Brazil
Expatriate footballers in Brazil
São Tomé and Príncipe expatriate sportspeople in Portugal
Expatriate footballers in Portugal